Burley-in-Wharfedale railway station serves the village of Burley in Wharfedale in West Yorkshire, England, in the City of Bradford. The station lies on the Wharfedale Line between Ilkley and Leeds/Bradford Forster Square. It is served by Class 333 units run by Northern Trains, who also manage the station.

The station is unstaffed (and has been so since October 1968) and was once the junction for the line to Leeds via . This route closed in 1965, as a result of the Beeching Axe. The station building still stands, but is now privately owned.

In February and March 2022, tactile paving was installed along both platform edges.

Facilities

Though unstaffed (as noted), the station does have a self-service ticket machine in place to allow passengers to buy before boarding; this can also be used to collect advance purchase tickets. Waiting shelters are provided on both platforms, which are linked by footbridge (step-free access is however possible to both via nearby streets).  Train running information is offered via CIS displays, automated announcements and timetable posters.

Services
During Monday to Saturday evenings and all day Sundays, services are hourly to/from both Leeds and Bradford Forster Square and there are two departures per hour to Ilkley.

References

External links

Railway stations in Bradford
DfT Category F1 stations
Former Otley and Ilkley Joint Railway stations
Railway stations in Great Britain opened in 1865
Northern franchise railway stations
railway station